Abchalagi (also Romanized as Ābchālagī; also known as Ābchālakī) is a village in Divshal Rural District, in the Central District of Langarud County, Gilan Province, Iran. At the 2006 census, its population was 121, in 35 families.

References 

Populated places in Langarud County